Room Temperature is  Nicholson Baker's second book, and continues the genre established in his first novel The Mezzanine, though this time the action spans a few minutes at the narrator's home (in Quincy, Massachusetts).

Mike is feeding his baby daughter, "the Bug", as her head rests in the crook of his arm. He blows in the direction of a mobile; twenty seconds and two dozen pages later, he is surprised to see the mobile move. Mike's thoughts wander as he contemplates, for example, the possibility of admitting to one's wife that one has been picking one's nose (body functions are discussed extensively, perhaps prompted by the baby's presence), or the juxtaposition of Debussy and Skippy peanut butter jars in a symphonic poem. The novel was received warmly but without great enthusiasm, as an enjoyable if slightly demure domestic follow-up to The Mezzanine. Mike may be expressing Baker's approach to writing when he thinks "...that with a little concentration one's whole life could be reconstructed from any single twenty-minute period randomly or almost randomly selected."

External links
Room Temperature Quotes
 Room Temperature on J-Walk

1990 American novels
Novels by Nicholson Baker
Novels set in Massachusetts
Quincy, Massachusetts
Novels set in one day